Holly Dodson is a Canadian singer-songwriter, composer, and music producer who is a co-founding member and front-woman of synthpop trio Parallels.

Early life
Dodson is the daughter of Juno Award-winning guitarist (of The Stampeders), composer, and producer Rich Dodson and sister of Canadian musician Nick Dodson. At the age of six, Dodson's began traveling with her family and her father's band during the band's reunion tour in 1992. Dodson's upbringing was heavily influenced by music, spending time in her father's 24-track recording studio, Marigold Studios in Toronto. She began writing songs at the age of sixteen and recorded a 12-song album The Carousel, which was never formally released.

Parallels
Dodson co-wrote Parallels' debut album Visionaries, and is the primary producer of the band's new material. Dodson was deemed one of the "Hottest Names to Know in Canadian Music" in Flares 30th Anniversary Issue.

References

Living people
Canadian composers
Canadian record producers
Canadian pop singers
Canadian women singer-songwriters
Canadian singer-songwriters
Musicians from Toronto
Canadian women record producers
Canadian women singers
Year of birth missing (living people)
Canadian women composers